Family Food Fight (abbreviated as FFF) is an Australian reality competition television series that aired on the Nine Network from 30 October 2017 until 11 December 2018. The series saw diverse and multi-generational Australian families go head-to-head in high-pressure cooking challenges inspired by real home cooking and family food traditions to win an ultimate prize of $100,000.

Although the first season of the series had disappointing ratings, a desire to sell the show internationally led it to be renewed for a second season, which premiered on 29 October 2018. Despite a number of international adaptations, the show struggled to find an audience locally and no further seasons have been commissioned.

Production
The series was announced at Network Nine's upfronts in November 2016. Auditions opened in February 2017, searching for family teams of four people with all members required to be amateur cooks; auditions closed on 13 April 2017. In July 2017, Matt Moran, Hayden Quinn and Anna Polyviou were announced as judges of the series with Tom Parker Bowles to appear as a guest judge. In episode 15 it was announced that Parker Bowles would remain with the show for the finals, and so he appeared in all episodes.

Season 2 saw the teams reduced from four contestants to two. Hayden Quinn opted not to return as a judge for the second season.

Contestants

Season 1 (2017)

Season 2 (2018)

Ratings

Season 1 (2017)

Season 2 (2018)

International versions

Argentina 
In August 2018, the format to Family Food Fight was picked up by Argentine broadcaster Telefe. Endemol Shine Latino produced the series, which premiered on 23 September 2018.

Brazil 

In July 2019, the format of Family Food Fight was picked up by Brazilian broadcaster SBT
which ordered a ten-episode series titled Famílias Frente a Frente (Families Face to Face) featuring twelve Brazilian families facing off in the kitchen. Endemol Shine Brasil produced the series, which was hosted by Tiago Abravanel and first released on Amazon Prime Video. The series premiered on 11 October 2019.

Italy 
In October 2019, a local version of Family Food Fight was announced with Lidia Bastianich, Joe Bastianich and Antonino Cannavacciuolo as judges. The show premiered in March 2020, initially on Sky Uno.

Mexico 

In April 2019, it was confirmed that the Mexican broadcaster Televisa acquired the franchise Family Food Fight to adapt it in Mexico in collaboration with Endemol Shine Boomdog and would be entitled Familias frente al fuego (Families in front of the fire). Its presenter is Inés Gómez Mont. It premiered on Las Estrellas on 14 July 2019.

Portugal 
In November 2018, the format to Family Food Fight was picked up by Portuguese broadcaster RTP1. Endemol Shine Iberia produced the series, which premiered in 2019, titled as Famílias Frente a Frente (Families Face to Face).

Switzerland 
In April 2019, Sat.1 announced that it would produce a five-part adaptation of the format, which premiered on 31 August 2019.

United States 

In June 2018, the format of Family Food Fight was picked up by American broadcaster ABC, which had ordered eight-episodes and featured eight American families facing off in the kitchen. Endemol Shine North America produced the series with cookbook author and food personality Ayesha Curry as both host and one of the judges. The series premiered on 20 June 2019.

See also

 List of Australian television series
 List of programs broadcast by Nine Network

References

Nine Network original programming
Australian cooking television series
Cooking competitions in Australia
Food reality television series
2017 Australian television series debuts
2018 Australian television series endings
Television series by Endemol
English-language television shows